Ulu Pandan Depot (Simplified Chinese: 乌鲁班丹车厂; Traditional Chinese: 烏魯班丹車廠) is a depot near Jurong East, Singapore and it serves the trains on the North South line and the East West line. With the opening of Tuas West Depot in 2017, fewer trains were deployed from Ulu Pandan Depot for the East West line, with majority of the trains were for the North South line.

It has a capacity of 45 trains and has an area of 130,000 square metres. Train inspections are carried out at this depot.

Commuters can have a glimpse of it while on a train between Clementi and Jurong East stations. It is located off Toh Tuck Avenue and sits along Toh Tuck Avenue. The depot is located between Clementi station and Jurong East station on the East West line and has 3 reception tracks: 2 tracks Westbound towards Jurong East station and 1 track Eastbound towards Clementi station.

History
Hiap Shing had won the contract for the earthworks at Ulu Pandan Depot on 13 August 1985.

Plans have also been made for the expansion of Ulu Pandan MRT Depot, with LTA commissioning an engineering study in 2015.

References

1988 establishments in Singapore
Clementi
Mass Rapid Transit (Singapore) depots